The 2003 IIHF World U18 Championships were held in Yaroslavl, Russia. The championships began on April 8, 2003, and finished on April 18, 2003. Games were played at Arena 2000 and Avtodizel Arena in Yaroslavl. Canada defeated Slovakia 3–0 in the final to claim the gold medal, while Russia defeated the United States 6–3 to capture the bronze medal.

Championship results

Preliminary round

Group A

Group B

Relegation round

Note: Matches  13-2  and  8–6  from the preliminary round (on April 13, 2003 and April 14, 2003 respectively) are included as well since these results carry forward

Final round

 beat  for the Bronze medal 6–3.
 beat  for 5th place 3–2 in Overtime.

Final standings

Division I

Division I consisted of two separate tournaments. The Group A tournament was held between 23 and 29 March 2003 in Ventspils, Latvia and the Group B tournament was held between 22 and 28 March 2003 in Briançon, France. Denmark and Norway won the Group A and Group B tournaments respectively and gained promotion to the Championship Division for the 2004 IIHF World U18 Championships. While Great Britain finished last in Group A and Ukraine last in Group B and were both relegated to Division II for 2004.

Final standings

Group A
 — promoted to the Championship Division for 2004

 — relegated to Division II for 2004

Group B
 — promoted to the Championship Division for 2004

 — relegated to Division II for 2004

Division II

Division II consisted of two separate tournaments. The Group A tournament was held between 17 and 23 March 2003 in Tallinn, Estonia and the Group B tournament was held between 5 and 11 March 2003 in Belgrade, Federal Republic of Yugoslavia. South Korea and Romania won the Group A and Group B tournaments respectively and gained promotion to Division I for the 2004 IIHF World U18 Championships. While Bulgaria finished last in Group A and South Africa last in Group B and were both relegated to Division III for 2004.

Final standings

Group A
 — promoted to Division I for 2004

 — relegated to Division III for 2004

Group B
 — promoted to Division I for 2004

 — relegated to Division III for 2004

Division III

Division III consisted of two separate tournaments. The Group A tournament was held between 5 and 8 March 2003 in Mexico City, Mexico and the Group B tournament was held between 6 and 9 February 2003 in Sarajevo, Bosnia and Herzegovina. Australia and Iceland won the Group A and Group B tournaments respectively and gained promotion to Division II for the 2004 IIHF World U18 Championships.

Final standings

Group A
 — promoted to Division II for 2004

Group B
 — promoted to Division II for 2004

References

External links
Official Championship results and statistics

 
IIHF World U18 Championships
IIHF World U18 Championships
Hockey
2003
World
April 2003 sports events in Europe